Rowan Jenkins (born 10 June 1991) is a Welsh rugby union player who plays for the Ospreys as a prop. He was a Wales under-18 international.

Jenkins made his debut for the Ospreys in 2016 having previously played for Aberavon RFC, Felinfoel RFC and Llanelli RFC.

References

External links 
Ospreys Player Profile

Welsh rugby union players
Ospreys (rugby union) players
Living people
1991 births
Rugby union players from Carmarthen
Leeds Tykes players
Rugby union props
Cardiff Rugby players